The Supreme Court is the highest court in the Republic of Poland. It is located in the Krasiński Square, Warsaw. 

One of the chambers of the Supreme Court, the Disciplinary Chamber, was suspended by a judgment of the CJEU. Despite the judgment, the chamber continues to operate.

The legal basis for the competence and activities of the Supreme Court is the Polish Constitution, the Act on the Supreme Court and the Presidential Decree on the organisation of the Supreme Court.

History 
The Supreme Court followed on from the Court of Cassation of the Principality of Warsaw. It began its work in 1917 during the First World War as the Royal Imperial Supreme Court (Polish: Królewsko-Cesarski Sąd Najwyższy). Pomian-Srzednicki was appointed the first president of the court. After Poland gained full independence in 1918, the Supreme Court was reformed by decree of 8 February 1919 and many judges who were considered to be loyal to the emperor were dismissed.

After the German invasion of Poland, the Supreme Court ceased its work. After the Second World War, the Supreme Court was reinstated with new judges who were now in line with the Soviet leadership. Its powers were reorganised by laws adopted in 1962 and 1984. At the turn of 1989 the Supreme Court was dissolved and re-established, but for the most part with the old judges from the communist era.

In 2002 a new legal basis for the organisation of the Supreme Court was created, replacing the old one of 1984.

2017–2018 Constitutional Crisis

In 2017 the Polish government passed a law which would have forced all Supreme Court judges into mandatory retirement apart from those granted an extension by the Minister of Justice. The bill was passed in the Polish Sejm and the Senate however following mass protests against the bill it was ultimately vetoed by President Andrzej Duda on 24 June 2017. A revised bill reduced mandatory retirement age of judges from 70 to 65. The bill was later signed by President Duda and came into force in July 2018. The law effectively retires 40% of the Supreme Court bench including the First President of the Supreme Court, Malgorzata Gersdorf. 

Polish opposition parties, the European Commission, the European Parliament, the Polish Supreme Court, and the National Council of the Judiciary have claimed the law is unconstitutional because it violates the principles of the independence of the judiciary. In August 2018 the Supreme Court sent questions to the European Court of Justice regarding the reforms. Under Union law the court can prevent the State law from coming into force if it undermines the treaties of the European Union regarding judicial independence.

On 17 December 2018, President Duda signed a law that will reinstate the judges who had been forced out of their jobs.

On 8 April 2020 the EU Court of Justice ruled in a court case ("Commission v Poland") that the state of Poland "had failed to fulfil its obligations under EU law". As a result, the Court granted "the Commission’s application for interim measures" which will likely be realised with monetary fines.

CJEU suspension of the Disciplinary Chamber

On 12 October 2020, Adam Tomczyński, a Judge from the Disciplinary Chamber, waived the immunity of Beata Morawiec, judge of the District Court in Kraków. Moments after that the European Association of Judges expressed its unbreakable solidarity to Judge Beata Morawiec and to all independent Polish judges and once again stated that "The Disciplinary Chamber of the Polish Supreme Court is not a court and cannot continue to act as one" and urges the European Commission to take all necessary measures to urgently reestablish the EU legal order in Poland.

Function
The Supreme Court supervises the adjudication in: 

 General courts: these are district, circuit, and appeal courts. They adjudicate in the areas of civil, criminal, family and labour law.
 Military courts: these are circuit and garrison courts. They deal with matters relating to crimes committed by soldiers in active service, civilian employees in military units, and prisoners of war.

The Supreme Court is the court of last resort of appeal against judgements in the lower courts (except for administrative courts). It also passes resolutions to clarify specific legal provisions and resolve disputable questions in specific cases. These however are not (at least technically) legally binding.

Chambers 
The Supreme Court has chambers for civil matters, criminal matters, labour and social security matters, exceptional supervision and public matters, and disciplinary matters.

Appointment of judges
The President of Poland appoints Supreme Court judges for an indefinite period. This is done upon a motion of the National Council of the Judiciary. The President also selects the First President of the court from candidates presented by the General Assembly of the Supreme Court. The First President holds office for a six-year term. The First President may be dismissed by the Sejm upon a motion by the President if found convicted of a crime.

In July 2018 a new law came into force which lowers the mandatory retirement age from 70 to 65. The introduction of this law is contested and the constitutionality of the law is being assessed. Critics have argued the law is aimed at removing non-pliant judges and installing appointees desired by the current government, led by the Law and Justice party.

There are 120 posts for judges.

List of First Presidents of the Supreme Court
{| class="wikitable" 
! style="text-align:center;" |No
! style="text-align:center;" |Name
!Image
! colspan="2" style="text-align:center;" |In office
!Term length
! style="text-align:center;" |Notes
|-
! colspan="7" |Republic of Poland
|-
| style="text-align:right;" |1.
| style="text-align:center;" |
|
| colspan="2" style="text-align:center;" |1 September 1917 – 28 February 1922
|
| style="text-align:center;" |
|-
| style="text-align:right;" |2.
| style="text-align:center;" |
|
| colspan="2" style="text-align:center;" |1 March 1922 – 3 August 1924
|
| style="text-align:center;" |
|-
| style="text-align:right;" |3.
| style="text-align:center;" |
|
| colspan="2" style="text-align:center;" |22 September 1924 – 17 January 1929
|
| style="text-align:center;" |
|-
| style="text-align:right;" |4.
| style="text-align:center;" |
|
| colspan="2" style="text-align:center;" |17 January 1929 – 1 September 1939
|
| style="text-align:center;" |
|-
! colspan="7" |Polish People's Republic
|-
| style="text-align:right;" |5.
| style="text-align:center;" |
|
| colspan="2" style="text-align:center;" |26 January 1945 – 12 November 1956
|
| style="text-align:center;" |
|-
| style="text-align:right;" |6.
| style="text-align:center;" |
|
| colspan="2" style="text-align:center;" |12 December 1956 – 22 May 1967
|
| style="text-align:center;" |
|-
| style="text-align:right;" |7.
| style="text-align:center;" |
|
| colspan="2" style="text-align:center;" |3 May 1967 – 21 January 1972
|
| style="text-align:center;" |
|-
| style="text-align:right;" |8.
| style="text-align:center;" |
|
| colspan="2" style="text-align:center;" |21 January 1972 – 1 April 1976
|
| style="text-align:center;" |
|-
| style="text-align:right;" |9.
| style="text-align:center;" |
|
| colspan="2" style="text-align:center;" |1 April 1976 – 14 May 1987
|
| style="text-align:center;" |
|-
|10.
| style="text-align:center;" |
|
|style="text-align:center;"  colspan="2" |14 May 1987 – 30 June 1990
|
| style="text-align:center;"|
|-
! colspan="7" |Republic of Poland
|-
!No
!Name
!
!In office
!President of Poland
!Term length
!Notes
|-
| style="text-align:right;" |11.
| style="text-align:center;" |
|
| style="text-align:center;" |1 July 1990 – 17 October 1998
| style="text-align:center;"|Wojciech Jaruzelski
|
| style="text-align:center;" |
|-
| style="text-align:right;" |12.
| style="text-align:center;" |Lech Gardocki
|
| style="text-align:center;" |17 October 1998 – 18 October 2010
| style="text-align:center;"|Aleksander Kwaśniewski
|
| style="text-align:center;" |
|-
| style="text-align:right;" |13.
| style="text-align:center;" |
|
| style="text-align:center;" |19 October 2010 – 9 January 2014(died in office)
| style="text-align:center;" rowspan="3" |Bronisław Komorowski
|
| style="text-align:center;" |
|-
| style="text-align:center;" |–
| style="text-align:center;" |Lech Paprzycki
|
| style="text-align:center;" |9 January 2014 – 30 April 2014|
| style="text-align:center;" |acting|-
| style="text-align:right;" |14.
| style="text-align:center;" |Małgorzata Gersdorf
|
| style="text-align:center;" |30 April 2014 – 30 April 2020
|
| style="text-align:center;" |
|-
| style="text-align:center;" |–
| style="text-align:center;" ||
| style="text-align:center;" |4 July 2018 – 20 July 2018| style="text-align:center;" rowspan="5" |Andrzej Duda
|
| rowspan=2 style="text-align:center;" |(disputed)rejected appointment|-
| style="text-align:center;" |–
| style="text-align:center;" ||
| style="text-align:center;" |13 September – 31 December 2018|
|-
| style="text-align:center;" |–
| style="text-align:center;" ||
| style="text-align:center;" |1 May 2020 – 15 May 2020|
| style="text-align:center;" |(disputed)resigned|-
| style="text-align:center;" |–
| style="text-align:center;" ||
| style="text-align:center;" |15 May 2020 – 25 May 2020|
| style="text-align:center;" |(disputed)
|-
| style="text-align:right;" |15.
| style="text-align:center;" |Małgorzata Manowska
|
| style="text-align:center;" |25 May 2020 – present
|
| style="text-align:center;" |(disputed)
|}

 Location 
From 1917 to 1939, the Supreme Court met in the Krasiński Palace, which had already housed the Court of Cassation of the Principality of Warsaw before 1812. From 1945 to 1950 the Supreme Court met in Łódź due to the destruction of Warsaw in the Second World War. From 1950 to 1999 it met in the building now used by the Warsaw Higher Regional Court. Since 1999, the Supreme Court has had its seat on Krasiński Square, diagonally opposite the Krasiński Palace, which is known for its 86 Latin inscriptions.

 Budget 
The budget of the Supreme Court is set in the annual budget of Poland. In 2019, expenditure amounted to approximately PLN 160 million and revenue to PLN 0.26 million.

 See also 

 Constitutional Tribunal of the Republic of Poland

 Literature 

 L. Garlicki, Z. Resich, M. Rybicki, S. Włodyka: Sąd Najwyższy w PRL. 1983.
 M. Pietrzak: Sąd Najwyższy w II Rzeczypospolitej. Czasopismo Prawno-Historyczne, 1981.
 A. Rzepliński: Sądownictwo w PRL. Polonia Book, London 1990.
 S. Włodyka: Ustrój organów ochrony prawnej'', Warsaw 1975.

Notes

References

External links

 Supreme Court of the Republic of Poland

Poland
Judiciary of Poland
1917 establishments in Poland
Courts and tribunals established in 1917